Barry Michael Cockcroft CBE was the Chief Dental Officer (CDO) for England.

Early life
Cockcroft qualified from the Dental School at the University of Birmingham in 1973.

Career
Cockcroft was a dentist working in Rugby in general practice for 27 years during which time he represented dentists locally on the Warwickshire Local Dental Committee (LDC), and nationally, after he was elected to the General Dental Services Committee (GDSC) in 1990. He was appointed Deputy CDO in November 2002, and he became the acting CDO on 1 October 2005,  before he took up the CDO post in July 2006.
He was appointed Commander of the Order of the British Empire (CBE) in the 2010 New Year Honours.

In 2015, after leaving the post at the DoH, Cockcroft became a non-executive director at UK Corporate dental provider MyDentist (Formally Integrated Dental Holdings), one of the largest providers of NHS and private dentistry in the country.

Personal life
Cockcroft is married and has three children.

He appeared on the 2012 Christmas Special of the BBC's University Challenge .

References

 

NHS Chief Professional Officers
Chief Dental Officers for England
English dentists
Living people
Year of birth missing (living people)
Commanders of the Order of the British Empire
Alumni of the University of Birmingham